An adversarial relationship in purchasing and supply arises when identical or equivalent good or services are available from competing suppliers and buyers/sellers are trying to gain an advantage over each other. Low levels of trust are characteristic of adversarial relationships.

Adversarial purchasing is a form of strategic management designed to take advantage of competition for a buyer's business in business-to-business relationships while simultaneously lowering the firm's dependence on a single supplier. Successful implementation of this strategy can lower the firm's prices and raise the service and attention gained from its suppliers.

References

External links
Lignan University Class Material

Marketing strategy
Business terms
Business-to-business